Leccinum schistophilum is a species of bolete fungus in the family Boletaceae. Found in Europe, where it grows in association with beech, it was described as new to science in 1981 by French mycologist Marcel Bon.

See also
List of Leccinum species

References

schistophilum
Fungi described in 1981
Fungi of Europe